This is a list of companies on the Shenzhen Stock Exchange up to 2011, along with their capital, industry, and listing date.  Many of these are subsidiaries of state-owned enterprises.

000001-000099

000100-000499

000500-000599

000600-000699

000700-000799

000800-000899

000900-001999

2001-2100 

 
Shenzhen Stock Exchange
Shenzhen